The yellowthroats are  New World warblers in the genus Geothlypis. Most members of the group have localised ranges in Mexico and Central America, but the masked yellowthroat has an extensive South American distribution, while the common yellowthroat breeds over much of North America.

All the yellowthroats have similar plumage, with yellow-green upperparts, yellow breast, and a mainly black bill. The adult male has a black facemask of variable extent, usually bordered above with a grey band. The female is similar, but lacks the black mask, and may be duller in plumage.

The breeding habitat of these warblers is typically marshes and other wet areas with dense low vegetation.  The eggs, two in most species, but up to five for common yellowthroat, are laid in a lined cup nest low in grass or rank vegetation.

Yellowthroat are usually seen in pairs, and do not associate with other species. They are often skulking, and feed on a range of insects.

The taxonomy of these closely related species is complicated, and it is sometimes difficult to define which forms merit species status. For example common yellowthroat, Belding's yellowthroat, Altamira yellowthroat, and Bahama yellowthroat are sometimes considered conspecific. Conversely masked yellowthroat can be split to three or even four species. The name 'yellowthroat' is sometimes used as an alternate name for the yellow-throated leaflove.

The geographical isolation of the various populations of this mainly sedentary group has led to its genetic divergence and speciation. This process can be seen in action in the case of masked yellowthroat, where the subspecies are separated by rainforest or the Andes, leading to the development of distinctive forms, such as the Central American race Geothlypis aequinoctialis chiriquensis. This form is found in the highlands of Costa Rica and western Panama, and is separated by 1000 km from its South American cousins, from which it differs in size, appearance and vocalisations.

The Kentucky warbler, mourning warbler, and MacGillivray's warbler, all previously thought to have been members of the genus Oporornis, have since been moved to Geothlypis.

Species

References 

 Curson, Quinn and Beadle, New World Warblers 

 Hilty, Birds of Venezuela 
 Stiles and Skutch, A guide to the birds of Costa Rica 

Geothlypis